Jermaine Barrington Anderson (born 16 May 1996) is an English professional footballer who plays as a midfielder for National League club Woking.

Career

Early life and career
Anderson was born in Camden, London. He was released by Arsenal age 16 before joining Peterborough United's youth system in 2012.

Peterborough United

2012–13 season 
On 6 November 2012, Anderson was an unused substitute for Peterborough in a 1–0 defeat to Brighton & Hove Albion. On 17 November, he made his professional debut with a 13-minute cameo appearance in a 4–1 defeat to Blackburn Rovers.

2013–14 season 
On 27 August 2013, Anderson made his first appearance of the season as a substitute in a 6–0 League Cup victory over Reading. After being named on the bench in the opening weeks of the season, Anderson made his full debut for the club in a 3–2 defeat to Brentford on 26 November. He remained in the team to play a further 10 consecutive league fixtures.

On 7 December, Anderson made his FA Cup debut while recording an assist in a 5–0 second round victory at Tranmere Rovers. He also played in the third round and third round replay as Peterborough fell to Kidderminster Harriers.

Missing out on the Football League Trophy second round and last 16 victories, Anderson made his debut in the competition in a 3–0 quarter-final victory at Newport County on 10 December. He played 45 minutes of the semi-final first leg against Swindon Town, and watched the second leg from the bench. Anderson did not feature in the squad that beat Chesterfield 3–1 in the final, but collected his first piece of silverware.

Making a one-minute league appearance in a 1–0 win at Stevenage on 22 February, Anderson also featured in a 0–0 draw with Port Vale on the final day of the season. He was not selected as part of the play-off losing squad.

2014–15 season 
Anderson became a regular for Peterborough during the 2014–15 season, and scored his first goal for the club in a 3–1 victory over Colchester United on 30 August 2014. After featuring the club's first 21 league fixtures, while also playing in the Football League Trophy, League Cup and FA Cup, Anderson was named on the bench throughout the festive period. He returned to the starting XI in late January, but managed just three appearances before being named on the bench once again.

In February, a broken foot ruled Anderson out for the remainder of the season. He made 27 appearances in all competitions throughout the season prior to his injury.

2015–16 season 
On 12 September 2015, Anderson created his first league assist in a 5–1 victory at Oldham Athletic. The following match saw him given the first dismissal of his career, a straight red card for violent conduct as his team drew 1–1 with Walsall. Anderson appeared to throw a drinks bottle into the crowd.

After serving his suspension, he immediately returned with another assist in a 2–1 win over Swindon Town. On 31 October, Anderson scored and assisted in a 3–2 defeat at Coventry City. Following up his performance with a goal against Fleetwood Town, he then added two goals and an assist in a 5–1 victory at Crewe Alexandra, before being named Football League Young Player of the Month.

On 6 December, Anderson was injured three minutes into an FA Cup tie with Luton Town. The knee injury ended his season and kept Anderson on the sidelines for 177 days.

2016–17 season 
Anderson made his return with a 45-minute appearance in a 3–2 victory at Rochdale on the opening day of the season, and on 16 August 2016 completed his first 90 minutes of the campaign while making an assist in a 5–1 win over Millwall.

After being an unused substitute in the EFL Cup first round win over AFC Wimbledon, Anderson started in the 3–1 second round defeat to Swansea City on 23 August before being substituted on the hour. On 30 August, Anderson captained the team in 6–1 defeat to Norwich City U23s in the EFL Trophy and scored his team's only goal.

On 10 September, Anderson suffered knee ligament damage in the first half of a 2–2 draw with Port Vale and was ruled out for the rest of the season.

2018–19 season
Anderson joined Peterborough's League One rivals Doncaster Rovers on 24 August 2018 on loan until January 2019.

Bradford City
Anderson signed for Bradford City in January 2019. In May 2019, following Bradford City's relegation to League Two, he was one of 3 first-team players to be offered a new contract by the club. In June 2019 he signed a new one-year contract with the club.

On 26 May 2020 it was announced that he was one of 10 players who would leave Bradford City when their contract expired on 30 June 2020.

Aldershot Town
On 5 December 2020, Anderson joined Aldershot Town on a short-term deal.

Woking
On 3 December 2021, following a long-term injury lay-off, Anderson joined National League side Woking on a deal until the end of the campaign. Anderson signed a new one-year contract extension in June 2022.

International career
On 18 December 2013, Anderson was named in an England under-18 training camp at St George's Park National Football Centre by manager Neil Dewsnip.

Career statistics

Notes

References

External links
Jermaine Anderson profile at the Peterborough United F.C. website
Jermaine Anderson profile at the Doncaster Rovers F.C. website

1996 births
Living people
Footballers from Camden Town
English footballers
England youth international footballers
Association football midfielders
Arsenal F.C. players
Peterborough United F.C. players
Doncaster Rovers F.C. players
Black British sportsmen
Bradford City A.F.C. players
Aldershot Town F.C. players
Woking F.C. players
English Football League players
National League (English football) players